Oni Buchanan (born 1975) is an American poet, and pianist. Her most recent poetry collection is Spring (University of Illinois Press, 2008), a 2007 National Poetry Series winner. Her discography includes three solo piano CDs on the independent Velvet Ear Records label. Her concert programming is often interdisciplinary in nature. She has performed solo recitals throughout the U.S. and abroad. She graduated from the University of Virginia, from the New England Conservatory of Music, with a Master's degree in piano performance, and from the University of Iowa Writers' Workshop an M.F.A. in poetry.  Her teachers included Russell Sherman, Stephen Drury, Daniel Mark Epstein, Patricia Zander, Uriel Tsachor, and Mimi Tung.

Published works
Full-Length Poetry Collections
 
 

Electronic Literature Works

Buchanan's large-scale kinetic poem, “The Mandrake Vehicles,” is included in the Electronic Literature Collection, Volume 2 (ELC2), published by MITH (Maryland Institute for Technology in the Humanities).

Anthology Publications

Reviews
Oni Buchanan's second poetry collection, Spring, is an exercise in language as vessel for spiritual experience and reverence for nature. As a musician and a poet, she puts more emphasis on sound than on syntax, and her poems are driven more by harmony and assonance than by grammar. Just as music hides melodies inside harmonies and accompaniments, Buchanan hides poetry within poetry, and she seeks out the physical representation of these layers throughout the collection. The culmination of this technique can be seen in "The Mandrake Vehicles," the final section of the collection (which is also presented as a flash animation on an accompanying CD), but she introduces her reader to hidden poetry as early as the collection's supernumerary prologue poem.

I've read it upwards of ten times. I've spent hours with it, sat down with it in my apartment at various times of day and night, carried it on the subway to and from work, and tucked it away for a few long train rides. I can say that I've tried, and then tried again. But after all the self-conscious worry about missing something here, about Doty's name somehow giving it validation, I simply cannot subscribe.

References

External links
 "Author's website"
 "Quickie interview #2: Oni Buchanan", pshares blog, October 19, 2006
 "Oni Buchanan (o.buchanan), Piano", Classical Connect
 "Portraits, Pictures & Prints for Piano", CDBaby
 
 Poem & Mini Interview: Poetry Society of America > New American Poets > Oni Buchanan

1975 births
Living people
University of Virginia alumni
New England Conservatory alumni
University of Iowa alumni
Poets from Massachusetts
Writers from Boston
American women poets
Musicians from Boston
21st-century American women pianists
21st-century American poets
21st-century American pianists